Rudi Lissau, born 26 June 1911 in Vienna and died 30 January 2004 in Brookthorpe, United Kingdom, was a Steiner school teacher, author, lecturer and anthroposophist.

Biography

Rudolf Lissau’s parents were both of Jewish origin but had become students of Rudolf Steiner and founded, together with an uncle, the Viennese branch of the Theosophical Society as a forum for his work in Vienna. Rudolf Steiner visited the family in their home from time to time. Rudi was impressed by the obvious awe in which his parents held Steiner and from the age of sixteen began to study Anthroposophy. From the time he completed school and began his studies at the university, he was a member of the “Vienna Youth Group” of gifted, young people, predominantly from assimilated Jewish backgrounds, who came together to study Rudolf Steiner’s works. The focal point of this group became, after he arrived in Vienna, Dr Karl Koenig, whose drive and idealism led them to agree to set up and work together in some common initiative.

After obtaining his PhD, Rudi took a position teaching in a school for the blind. On the day Hitler’s armies occupied Austria in 1938, Rudi Lissau, who, like most of the other members of the group, had laid his plans, left Austria for Britain. One of the few who did not go with them was his sister, who decided to throw in her lot with the Jewish people and did not survive the war. Rudi was the only one of the group that had made it to England who did not join with Dr Koenig in the founding of Camphill, though he remained on terms of intimate friendship with all of them.

In London, Rudi began once again to work in a school for the blind until, like other enemy aliens, he was interned on the Isle of Man. His wife Hedda, also from Vienna, found him a post at the recently founded Wynstones School in Gloustershire and so obtained his release. He determined to make a success of this although he had never taught seeing children or applied the Steiner methods in his teaching – and he ended up staying for forty years. It was he that built up the high school at Wynstones and taught History, Geography, Latin, Greek, German and Music, being himself an accomplished pianist. He conducted hikes and ski tours with his students and encouraged their love of the countryside.

Though he greatly valued life in Britain, he never lost his love for his home in Austria or his gratitude for the outstanding classical education he had received in Vienna. He met and conferred with Viktor Frankl and Ludwig Wittgenstein who both made a deep impression on him and stimulated his profound interest for contemporary issues that were the basis of his extraordinary knowledge and ability to address such a variety of subjects in his teaching and lecturing. Vienna had also given him his background in classical music, his love for the mountains and the landscape that he imparted to his own daughters and the many children in his classes.

It was also in Vienna that he had schooled himself in the ideas of Rudolf Steiner, something that turned into a lifelong study and passion. It was this extensive knowledge and understanding of Steiner’s work that led him to his final engagement as the author of several books, a large number of articles and a sought-after lecturer on Anthroposophy all over Europe, North America and New Zealand.

Books
 Christian Morgensterns Form- und Sprachkunst (as Rudolf Lissau), Wien 1936
 The Challenge of the Will: Experiences with Young Children by Margaret Meyerkort and Rudi Lissau.
 Rudolf Steiner College Press; Revised edition (December 2002) 
 Rudolf Steiner: His Life, Work, Inner Path and Social Initiatives by Rudi Lissau. Hawthorn Press Ltd; 2nd edition (April 27, 2005) 
 Rudolf Steiner's Social Intentions by Rudi Lissau. New Economy Publications (December 1996) 
 Chosen Destiny – article by Rudi Lissau in Judaism and Anthroposophy Edited by M. Spiegler and F. Paddock, Anthroposophic Press (September 1, 2003)

References

Anthroposophists
1911 births
2004 deaths
Waldorf education